The 2003–04 Asia League Ice Hockey season was the first season of Asia League Ice Hockey. Five teams participated in the league, and the Nippon Paper Cranes won the championship.

Standings

External links
 Asia League Ice Hockey

Asia League Ice Hockey
Asia League Ice Hockey seasons
Asia